Hla Tun (also spelt Hla Htun) is the incumbent Minister of the President's Office of Myanmar (Burma) and a former Minister for Finance and Revenue of Myanmar. He is a retired Major General in the Myanmar Army and served as Director of Military Ordnance before he joined the Cabinet.

References

Finance ministers of Myanmar
Government ministers of Myanmar
Burmese military personnel
People from Yangon
1951 births
Living people
Union Solidarity and Development Party politicians
Specially Designated Nationals and Blocked Persons List
Individuals related to Myanmar sanctions